Eisstadion im Sahnpark, is an arena in Crimmitschau, Germany.  It is primarily used for ice hockey, and is the home to the ETC Crimmitschau of the 2nd Bundesliga.  It opened in 1964 and holds 5,222 spectators.

References

Indoor arenas in Germany
Indoor ice hockey venues in Germany
Buildings and structures in Zwickau (district)
Sports venues in Saxony
Crimmitschau